Princess Elena of Romania (born 15 November 1950) is the second eldest daughter of King Michael I and Queen Anne of Romania.

Elena will be first in the line of succession to the former Romanian throne and headship of the House of Romania if her elder sister Margareta dies without issue in the future.

Early life

Birth
Elena was born on 15 November 1950 at Clinique de Montchoisi in Lausanne, Switzerland as the second daughter of King Michael I and Queen Anne. She was baptised in the Orthodox faith; her godmothers were her paternal grandmother Helen, Queen Mother of Romania (who was also her namesake) and also Queen Mary of the United Kingdom.

Childhood
Elena spent her childhood at her family homes in Lausanne, Switzerland, and in the United Kingdom at Ayot House, St Lawrence, Hertfordshire; during holidays she and her sisters spent time with their grandmother, Helen, Queen Mother in Florence, Italy at Villa Sparta and in Denmark with Princess Margaret and Prince René. She and her sisters were told "fascinating tales of a homeland they couldn't visit" by their father.

Education
Elena received her primary education in Switzerland and her secondary at Effingham House in Little Common, Bexhill-on-Sea, East Sussex; she was fond of sports during her school years, playing on goal defence in the netball team.

Careers
In the mid 1970s Elena taught handicapped children for a short period of time in London and after her leave she began a two-year course in art restoration; following the end of her course she worked in an art restoration firm in London.

Activities
In the 1980s Elena along with her first husband Robin Medforth-Mills started a project to train 45 handicapped Ethiopian refugees in printing, bookbinding and leatherwork. In 1982 Elena founded an International school in Gezira, Sudan.

In 1990 along with Elena’s first husband, the then-Lord Mayor of Newcastle, Terry Cooney, and Harry Charrington was a founder-member of the North-East Relief Fund for Romania, which helped victims of the Ceausescu regime.

On 26 June 2011, Elena and her second husband Alexander Nixon visited the Queen Elizabeth Sixth Form College in Darlington, County Durham, England to present awards to students who went to Romania for voluntary work and helping to build and repair housing in Brașov, a project based around the Roma community.

On 3 October 2011, Elena attended the 100th commemorative anniversary of the historic Western travels of ʻAbdu'l-Bahá in London, as a great granddaughter of Queen Marie who had converted to the Baháʼí Faith, Elena spoke of how her great grandmother's Baháʼí legacy has inspired her to help those of need.

On 25 April 2012, for the Diamond Jubilee festivities of Queen Elizabeth II, Elena and her second husband inaugurated Royal teas: the UK's only Royal Tea room in Stanhope, County Durham. Following the inauguration, on 19 May Elena along with King Michael I, Crown Princess Margareta, her brother-in-law Prince Radu, her husband Alexander Nixon and her son Prince Nicholas attended a Military parade at Windsor Great Park and a Garden party at Windsor Castle hosted by Prince Andrew, Duke of York and Prince Edward, Earl of Wessex.

Elena also annually attends the Guildhall banquet of the Guild of Freemen of the City of London and the delegation of the Two Sicilian Sacred Military Constantinian Order of Saint George in London.

In Romania
After 50 years of exile of the Romanian royal family from Romania, in 1990 Elena's sisters Crown Princess Margareta and Princess Sophie visited Romania for the first time following the Romanian Revolution and overthrow of the Communist dictator Nicolae Ceaușescu in December 1989, she along with the royal family were involved to help the Romanians.

Elena's first official appearance in Romania was on 19 April 1992 on Easter Day along with former King Michael I, his wife Anne, her first husband Robin Medforth-Mills, and her son Nicholas, where they were met with hundreds of thousands of supporters; Elena and her son Nicholas famously waved the Royal Flag from a balcony in Revolution Square. She came again on Christmas Day of 1997 when the entire royal family entered Romania for the first time after 50 years of exile.

Since her first visit Elena occasionally visited Romania for family gatherings and for occasions such as: the 60th birthday celebration of Crown Princess Margareta and the 90th birthday celebrations of King Michael I. However, since 2013 Elena has increased her activities in Romania by attending investiture ceremonies, presenting awards, book launches and Christmas gatherings.

Elena was present at the Lying in State of King Michael I in December 2017 and Queen Anne in August 2016 (held firstly at Peles Castle, and then in the Throne Room of the Royal Palace in both cases), at their public funerals in Bucharest and at their burials in Curtea de Argeș.

Elena currently spends her time between Britain with her second husband Alexander and her daughter Elisabeta-Karina at her estate in Easington, County Durham and in Romania at Elisabeta Palace.

Marriages

First marriage
On 20 July 1983, Elena married Robin Medforth-Mills (1942–2002) in a civil ceremony at Durham, England. On 24 September 1983, they married in a royal ceremony at a Greek Orthodox church in Lausanne, Switzerland. The wedding party included King Michael I, his cousin former King Constantine II of Greece and his wife Queen Anne-Marie, who all served as Koumbaros; bridesmaids included her youngest sister Princess Maria, her second cousins Princess Alexia of Greece and Denmark and Princess Mafalda of Savoy; and also Fabiola Fruchaud. Elena and Robin had two children.

 Nicholas Michael de Roumanie Medforth-Mills (b. La Tour Hospital, Meyrin, Geneva, Switzerland 1 April 1985), formerly HRH Prince Nicholas of Romania.  He married Alina Maria Binder, a Romanian journalist, in a civil ceremony on 6 October 2017 in Henley-on-Thames. On 30 September 2018 the couple married religiously at Saint Elijah Church in Sinaia, and the party took place at Sinaia Casino.
 Elisabeta Karina de Roumanie Medforth-Mills (b. Princess Mary Maternity Hospital, Newcastle-upon-Tyne, England, 4 January 1989), goddaughter of the novelist Catherine Cookson and Margareta, Custodian of the Romanian Crown. 2nd in line to the defunct throne after her mother. The family lived at Flass Hall, Esh Winning, Durham.

They were divorced on 28 November 1991 after 8 years of marriage.

Second marriage

Elena was remarried on 14 August 1998 in a civil ceremony at Peterlee to Alexander Philips Nixon McAteer (born 22 October 1964). The marriage was private and was attended by the Romanian royal family, the groom's mother, and close friends. The groom was given the style His Excellency Domnul Alexander McAteer. Alexander changed his surname to Nixon. He is a Knight of the Sacred Military Constantinian Order of Saint George, and holds a number of Romanian decorations. He has consistently refused to take any royal title.
 
Elena and Alexander married religiously at the Coronation Cathedral, Alba Iulia, on 11 September 2013, privately.

Honours

National
  House of Romania: Knight Grand Officer of the Order of Carol I
  House of Romania: Knight Grand Cross of the Order of the Crown
  House of Romania: Knight of the Royal Decoration of the Custodian of the Crown, Special Class

Foreign honours
  Two Sicilian Royal Family: Recipient of the Sacred Military Constantinian Meritorious Medal of Saint George, Special Class
  Two Sicilian Royal Family:Knight Grand Cross of the Royal Order of Francis I (29 July 2012)
  Montenegrin Royal Family: Knight Grand Cross of the Royal Order of Prince Danilo I, Special Class

Ancestry

References

External links
 Official website of the Romanian royal family
 Official blog of the Romanian royal family

1950 births
Living people
House of Romania
Romanian princesses
Grand Crosses of the Order of the Crown (Romania)
Members of the Romanian Orthodox Church
People from Lausanne
People from Esh Winning
Daughters of kings